The 1991–92 English Hockey League season took place from October 1991 until March 1992.

The Men's National League was sponsored by PizzaExpress and won by Havant . The Women's National League was sponsored by Typhoo and was won by Slough.

The Men's Hockey Association Cup was won by Hounslow and the AEWHA Cup was won by Hightown.

Men's Pizza Express National League First Division League Standings

Women's Typhoo National League First Division League Standings 

Missing results* - Ealing v Chelmsford (15 Mar), Sutton Coldfield v Yate (15 Mar), Sherwood v Hightown (15 Mar), Ipswich v Wimbledon

Men's Cup (Hockey Association Cup)

Quarter-finals

Semi-finals

Final 
(Held at Luton Town Football Club on 3 May)

Hounslow
Jason Barrow, Simon Hazlitt, Paul Bolland, Mike Williamson, Jon Potter, David Hacker, Andy Ferns (capt), Martyn Grimley, Nick Gordon, Robert Thompson, Jon Rees
Teddington
Garry Meredith, Mark Riley, Stuart Blan, Paul Smith, Jason Laslett (capt), Tyrone Moore, Jon Hauck (N Gardiner sub), Jon Royce, Phil McGuire, Tony Colclough (Martin Le Huray sub), Andy Billson

Women's Cup (AEWHA Cup)

Quarter-finals

Semi-finals

Final 
(Held at Milton Keynes on 11 April)

Scorers
Hightown - Jackie Crook, Fiona Lee, Tina Cullen / Slough - Lesley Hobley, Denise Shorney (2)

References 

1991
field hockey
field hockey
1991 in field hockey
1992 in field hockey